Mitrobates (Old Persian: ,); (fl.c. 525 - 520 BC) was an Achaemenid satrap of Daskyleion (Hellespontine Phrygia) under the reigns of Cyrus the Great, who nominated him for the role, and Cambyses. After Cambyses died, and during the struggles for succession that followed, he is said to have been assassinated, together with his son Cranaspes, by the neighbouring satrap of Lydia, Oroetes, who wanted to expand his Anatolian territories. After the assassination, Oroetes added the territory of Hellespontine Phrygia to his own.

 

These events took place in the troubled times of the interregnum between Cambyses and Darius I, with the usurpation of Gaumata, who Herodotus refers to as "the Magians". The story of early satraps of Asia Minor, including Mitrobates, was related by Herodotus.

Mitrobates is the first known Persian satrap of Daskyleion ( BCE). Following the reorganisation of satraps by Darius I, he was succeeded by Megabazus (circa 500 BCE) and then his son Oebares II ( BCE) and Artabazus (479 BCE), who established the Persian Pharnacid dynasty, which would rule Hellespontine Phrygia until the conquests of Alexander the Great (338 BCE).

References

6th-century BC Iranian people
Achaemenid satraps of Hellespontine Phrygia
Officials of Cyrus the Great